Adetomyrma goblin is a species of ant that belongs to the genus Adetomyrma. They are native to Madagascar. The species was described in 2012 by Yoshimura & Fisher.

References

Amblyoponinae
Blind animals
Insects described in 2012
Hymenoptera of Africa
Endemic fauna of Madagascar